FK Pļaviņas DM is a Latvian football club based in Pļaviņas. They are currently playing in the Latvian Second League. They compete in the Latvian Football Cup.

References

Football clubs in Latvia